Sigurd Berge (1 July 1929 – 1 February 2002) was a Norwegian composer.

He graduated in 1952, then studied at the Music Conservatory in Oslo. He studied modern electronic music in Copenhagen and Utrecht. Groundbreaking "modern music" pieces from late 50's to early 80's including Horn Call (1972) and Illuxit (1974). He was the president of the Norsk Komponistforening (Society of Norwegian Composers) from 1985 to 1988. He wrote multiple books and articles about creative use of music.

Production

Selected works 
 Pezzo orchestrale (1959)  
 Episode (1959)
 Sinus (1959)
 Raga for oboe and orchestra (1959)
 Chroma (1963).
 The raindrop postlude (1968)  .
 Moon landscape (1971)  
 Horn call (1972).  Written for Frøydis Ree Wekre.
 Illuxit (1974).  For children’s choir.
 Juvenes (1976).  For string orchestra.
 Trio for tre horn (1986).  For Hot Lips Trio.
 Mørk maske (1995).

Discography 
 Early Electronic Works, Prisma Records, (2010)

External links 
 
Biography from MIC Music Information Centre Norway
List of works from the National Library of Norway

1929 births
2002 deaths
20th-century classical composers
Norwegian classical composers
Male classical composers